Eugene Concrete Co, Ltd. (Hangul: 유진콘크리트) is a South Korean cement, concrete in chemical company, headquartered in Seoul. Established in 1979, it is a remicon ('Ready Mixed Concrete')  and ascon  product manufacturer. It is under the Eugene Group group family.

Brand
Eugene Concrete
Isoon Concrete

Products
Cement (Portland cement, Mixed cement, Coarse cement)
Aggregate
Slag Powder
Slag Cement
Plyash
Mix Cement
Color Ascon

See also
Eugene Group
Economy of South Korea

References

External links
Eugene Concrete Homepage 
Isoon Concrete Homepage 

Chemical companies of South Korea
Chemical companies established in 1979
Eugene Group
Cement companies of South Korea
South Korean brands